The N. E. Informer (Formerly the New England Informer) is a monthly news magazine that serves the African American community, based in Massachusetts. It was founded in 2000, but folded shortly thereafter and was relaunched in 2006 by Doreen Wade.

Wade, who was nominated for Massachusetts Small Business Person of the Year in 2013 by the U.S. Small Business Administration, acts as publisher and CEO of the paper. She is also the founder of Salem United, a group seeking to preserve and restore the Salem Willows Black Picnic.

The paper seeks to publish information that will "uplift, educate and inform" communities of color. The news magazine's print edition was distributed when the Democratic National Convention was in Boston in 2004 which gave the Informer a much wider readership.

References

External links
 Official Website

Magazines published in Boston
African-American magazines
Magazines established in 2000
News magazines published in the United States